In computer science, program derivation is the derivation of a program from its specification, by mathematical means.

To derive a program means to write a formal specification, which is usually non-executable, and then apply mathematically correct rules in order to obtain an executable program satisfying that specification. The program thus obtained is then correct by construction.  Program and correctness proof are constructed together.

The approach usually taken in formal verification is to first write a program, and then provide a proof that it conforms to a given specification.  The main problems with this are that
 the resulting proof is often long and cumbersome;
 no insight is given as to how the program was developed; it appears "like a rabbit out of a hat";
 should the program happen to be incorrect in some subtle way, the attempt to verify it is likely to be long and certain to be fruitless.

Program derivation tries to remedy these shortcomings by
 keeping proofs shorter, by development of appropriate mathematical notations;
 making design decisions through formal manipulation of the specification.

Terms that are roughly synonymous with program derivation are: transformational programming, algorithmics, deductive programming.

The Bird-Meertens Formalism is an approach to program derivation.

See also
 Automatic programming
 Hoare logic
 Program refinement
 Design by contract
 Program synthesis
 Proof-carrying code

References
  Edsger W. Dijkstra, Wim H. J. Feijen, A Method of Programming, Addison-Wesley, 1988, 188 pages
 Edward Cohen, Programming in the 1990s, Springer-Verlag, 1990
 Anne Kaldewaij, Programming: The Derivation of Algorithms, Prentice-Hall, 1990, 216 pages
  David Gries, The Science of Programming, Springer-Verlag, 1981, 350 pages
 Carroll Morgan (computer scientist), Programming from Specifications,  International Series in Computer Science (2nd ed.), Prentice-Hall, 1998.
 Eric C.R. Hehner, a Practical Theory of Programming, 2008, 235 pages
 A.J.M. van Gasteren. On the Shape of Mathematical Arguments. Lecture Notes in Computer Science #445, Springer-Verlag, 1990. Teaches how to write proofs with clarity and precision.
 Martin Rem. "Small Programming Exercises", appeared in Science of Computer Programming, Vol.3 (1983) through Vol.14 (1990).
 Roland Backhouse. Program Construction: Calculating Implementations from Specifications. Wiley, 2003.  .
 Derrick G. Kourie, Bruce W. Watson. The Correctness-by-Construction Approach to Programming. Springer-Verlag, 2012. . Provides a step-by-step explanation of how to derive mathematically correct algorithms using small and tractable refinements.